Kurukshetra is an international techno-management fest conducted annually by the College of Engineering, Guindy (CEG) in Chennai, Tamil Nadu, India. It is a four-day event organized by the college's largest technical body, the CEG Tech Forum (CTF). The name of the fest derives from the location of the apocalyptic battle between the Kauravas and the Pandavas in the ancient Indian epic, the Mahabharata. The tag-line of the fest, "The Battle of Brains", refers to the battle. The fest was first held in 2007 and was the first techno-management festival in India to be awarded UNESCO patronage. Its logo, the cyclotron, symbolizes the celebration of the indomitable spirit of engineering and innovation.

Working committee
The festival is organized by CEG Tech Forum. Founded in 2006, the Forum is a student-run organization, currently consisting of 19 teams: Brand Relations, Content, Design, Events, Finance, Guest Lectures, Hospitality, Human Resources, Industry Relations and Media, Initiatives, Internal Auditing, Logistics, Marketing, Projects, Promo, Quality Assurance and Control, Technical Operations, Workshops, Xceed (outreach) and Karnival (entertainment). Overall, there are around 600 members at various levels of the hierarchy.

History 
Hosted for the first time in January 2007, the fest included workshops entitled "Autonomous Robotics", "Ethical Hacking" and "Need for Speed" as part of the event. The project exhibition event received an overwhelming response with more than 250 entries and 25 teams short-listed for the final display.

Kurukshetra was the first student-organized tech fest in India to receive UNESCO patronage, in 2011. Kurukshetra was also titled Green Fest by the UN Conference for Sustainable Development in the previous edition in 2012. The student-managed committee is certified to the ISO 9001:2015 quality standard.

Karnival 

Karnival is an event that presents displays on science, technology, arts, history and culture. Some of the past exhibits are a magic show and 3D-floor painting held in 2014, an Arjun tank demonstration and laser tag game in 2015, and caricature workshop, photography workshop, Rubik's cube workshop and virtual reality exhibition in 2016.

Guest lectures

Workshops
The workshops range all over the radar of technology from aero-modelling, and robotics to motorcycles. Some of the notable workshops in previous editions are:

References 

College festivals in India
Technical festivals in India